Adam Heinrich Wilhelm Uloth (1 March 1804 in Homberg (Efze) – 11 April 1885 in Kassel-Wehlheiden) was a German politician and from 4 November 1846 until 13 October 1856 mayor of Marburg.

References 

1804 births
1885 deaths
People from Homberg (Efze)
Mayors of Marburg